The demographics of Estonia in the 21st century result from historical trends over more than a thousand years, as with most European countries, but have been disproportionately influenced by events in the second half of the 20th century. The Soviet occupation (1944–1991), extensive immigration from Russia and other parts of the former USSR, and the eventual restoration of independence of Estonia, have all had a major effect on Estonia's current ethnic makeup.

Languages spoken in Estonia largely reflect the composition of the indigenous and immigrant ethnic groups residing in Estonia, and thus have changed with historical trends affecting the ethnic makeup of the country. Similarly to other northern European peoples, religion plays a rather small part in the lives of most Estonians.

Overall, the quality-of-life indices for Estonia indicate a modern industrial state. The population declined annually from 1991 until 2016, except for a brief pause in 2010. Since 2016 immigration has exceeded emigration, making the overall population grow.

Population 

According to the preliminary data of Statistics Estonia, on 1 January 2023, the population of Estonia was 1,357,739 persons.

The population increased from 1,351,640 in January 1970 to 1,570,599 in January 1990. After 1990, Estonia lost about 15% of its population (230,000 people). The population decreased to 1,294,455 by December 2011, a figure lower than that recorded in 1970.
 1,331,824 (2021 Population and Housing Census) 
 1,294,455 (2011 Population Count and Housing Census)  
 1,370,052 (2000 Population Count and Housing Census) 

Decreasing population pressures are explained by a higher death than birth rate and periods of an excess of emigrants over immigrants.

Since 2015 the country has experienced population growth. The population mainly increased as a result of net immigration of European Union citizens. Citizens of Russia and Ukraine made up the bulk of non-EU immigration. The increase was detected through methodological changes in data collection. Initially a population decrease had been reported.

Age structure 

Between 1970 and 1990 the age structure of Estonia was rather stable with around 22% of the population in the age group 0–14 years, 66% between 15 and 65, while 12% were 65 years or older. Due to the low birth rates after 1990, the proportion of the population 0–14 years of age dropped to 15% in 2009, while the proportion of 65 years or older gradually increased to 17% in 2009. The proportion of the age group 15–64 also slightly increased to 68% in 2009.

Births and deaths 
From 1947 to 1989 the number of births was higher than the number of deaths, but from 1990 onwards the number of deaths outnumbered the number of births. The crude birth rate of 2011 was 10.96 (14,679 births) and the crude death rate of 2011 was 11.38 (15,244 deaths), making the rate of natural increase −0.42 (−565). For more detailed historic data, see the table of birth and death rates below.

Total fertility rate 
Between 1970 and 1990, the total fertility rate (TFR) was little over 2 children born per woman. A fast decrease of the TFR occurred after independence. In 1998 the lowest rate was recorded: 1.28 children born per woman. The TFR slightly recovered in the subsequent years. The TFR was 1.66 in 2008 and 1.52 in 2011.

Infant mortality rate 
The infant mortality rate in Estonia has decreased considerably during the past decades. In 1970 the rate was 17.7 per 1,000 live births. The rate decreased to 17.1 in 1980, 12.3 in 1990 and 8.4 in 2000. The lowest infant mortality rate was recorded in 2011: 2.6.

Life expectancy at birth 

Life expectancy in Estonia is lower than in most Western European countries. During the Soviet era life expectancy in males was between 64 and 66 years and in females between 73 and 75 years. After the independence, life expectancy decreased for a number of years. In 1994, the lowest life expectancy was recorded: 60.5 years in males and 72.8 in females. After 1994, life expectancy gradually increased to reach 68.3 years in males and 79.2 in females in 2012.

By data from Statistics Estonia life expectancy at birth in both 2019 and 2020 was 74.4 years for males and 82.8 years for females, on average for all 78,8 years. 
Life expectancy has increased during last years for both sexes, men are expected to live disability-free for 54.1 years and women for 57.6 years. Males live 72.7 percent of their life in good health and females 70 percent.

For comparison, in 2018 the average life expectancy for men in Europe was 78.3 years and for women 83.6 years.

Immigration 
As the cumulative negative natural growth was about 82,000 during 1991–2010, the remainder of the population decline of Estonia since 1990 (230,000 people in total) was caused by emigration (150,000 people or about 10% of the population of Estonia in 1990). Mainly ethnic Russians, Ukrainians and Belarusians emigrated. Consequently, the proportion of these ethnic groups decreased as can be seen in the results of the 2000 census (see below). Data from 2000 to 2009 also shows that the number of emigrants is larger than the number of immigrants, but on a much lower lever than in the 1990s.

Foreign-born population by census in 2000, 2011 and 2021:

There were a total of 201,265 foreign-born people in Estonia at 31 December 2021, representing 15% of the population. 55% of them were born in Russia, and a total of 82% in a Post-Soviet countries.

In 2022, according to the data on registered migration (from the Population Register), 42,022 persons immigrated to Estonia and 10,422 persons emigrated from Estonia. Net migration was positive, 31,600 persons more staying than leaving Estonia. Both registered immigration and net migration were several times bigger than the average of recent years, due to the arrival of war refugees from Ukraine. There were 1,820 emigrants more than in 2021. Based on citizenship, the largest number of immigrants settling in Estonia had Ukrainian citizenship (31,594).

In 2021, the population of Estonia decreased by 5,315 persons due to negative natural increase and increased by 7,043 persons as a result of positive net migration – 19,524 persons immigrated to Estonia and 12,481 persons emigrated from Estonia (In 2020: 16,209 persons immigrated and 12,427 persons emigrated). The destination countries for migration were Finland, Ukraine and Russia in both directions.

Ethnic groups 

Today, Estonia is an ethnically fairly diverse country, ranking 97th out of 239 countries and territories in 2001 study by Kok Kheng Yeoh. In 2008, thirteen of Estonia's fifteen counties were over 80% ethnic Estonian. The counties with the highest percentage Estonians are Hiiu County (98.4%) and Saare County (98.3%).  However, in Harju County (which includes the national capital, Tallinn) and Ida-Viru County, ethnic Estonians make up only 59.6% (55.0% in Tallinn) and 19.7% of the population, respectively.  In those two counties, Russians account for 32.4% (36.4% in Tallinn) and 71.2% of the population, respectively.  In the nation as a whole, Russians make up 23% of the total population.

After gaining independence following World War I a population census was held in 1922 and 1934. At that time Estonians were still the predominant ethnic group, while all others constituted 12% of the population of Estonia.

Major Jewish communities were present in Estonia between 1918 and 1940 in Tallinn, Pärnu, Kilingi-Nõmme, Narva, Tartu, Valga, and Võru.

Population of Estonia by ethnic group 1897–2021

As a result of the Soviet occupation from 1944 to 1991 and Soviet policies, the share of ethnic Estonians in the population resident within currently defined boundaries of Estonia dropped to 61.5% in 1989, compared to 88% in 1934.  But in the decade following the restoration of independence, large scale emigration by ethnic Russians, as well as ethnic groups of other former Soviet countries, and the removal of the Russian military bases in 1994 caused the proportion of ethnic Estonians in Estonia to increase from 61.5% in 1989 to 68.7% in 2008.  In the same period the proportion of ethnic Russians decreased from 30.0% to 25.6%, the proportion of ethnic Ukrainians decreased from 3.1% to 2.1%, and the proportion of ethnic Belarusians decreased from 1.8% to 1.2%.

In 2008, the largest ethnic groups in Estonia were Estonians 68.7%, Russians 25.6%, Ukrainians 2.1%, Belarusians 1.2%, and Finns 0.8%.  These five groups made up 98.4% of Estonia's population.

The numbers had changed a little by the time of the 2021 census, when they were reported as Estonians 69.1%, Russians 23.6%, Ukrainians 2.1%, Belarusians 0.9%, and Finns 0.6%.

Languages 

Many languages are spoken in Estonia, including Estonian (official), Võro, Russian, Ukrainian, English, Finnish, German and others. According to the census of 2000, 109 languages were spoken natively in Estonia. By 2011, the number of languages spoken natively had increased to 157, mainly due to new immigrants. However, most of these languages were used only between relatives or compatriots, while only 30 languages were spoken on a daily basis in families.

Estonian and Finnish are closely related, belonging to the same Finnic branch of the Uralic language family. The two languages are only partially mutually intelligible, although learning to comprehend and speak each other's languages is fairly easy for native speakers. Estonian and Finnish are only distantly related to the Hungarian language.

Written with the Latin script, Estonian is the language of the Estonian people and the official language of the country. One-third of the standard vocabulary is derived from adding suffixes to root words. The oldest known examples of written Estonian originate in 13th century chronicles. During the Soviet era, the Russian language was imposed in parallel to, and often instead of, Estonian in official use.

Population of Estonia by command of foreign languages (as not the first language)

Census data show that in 2021 an estimated 76% of Estonia’s population speak a foreign language. While 10 years ago the most widely spoken foreign language in Estonia was Russian, today it is English. Estonian is spoken by 84% of the population: 67% speak it as a mother tongue and 17% as a foreign language.

Religion 

According to the most recent Eurobarometer Poll 2010, 18% of Estonian citizens responded that "they believe there is a God", whereas 50% answered that "they believe there is some sort of spirit or life force" and 29% that "they do not believe there is any sort of spirit, god, or life force". This, according to the survey, would have made Estonians the most non-religious people in the then 27-member European Union. A survey conducted in 2006–2008 by Gallup showed that 14% of Estonians answered positively to the question: "Is religion an important part of your daily life?", which was the lowest among 143 countries polled.

In 2000, according to the census, 29.2% of the population considered themselves to be related to any religion, thereof:

 13.6% Lutheran Christians
 12.8% Orthodox Christians
 6,009 Baptists
 5,745 Roman Catholics
 4,254 Jehovah's Witnesses
 2,648 Pentecostals
 2,515 Old Believers
 1,561 Adventists
 1,455 Methodists
 1,387 Muslims
 5,008 followers of other religions

In 2011, according to the census, 29.31% of the population considered themselves to be related to any religion:

 16.15% Orthodox Christians
 9.91% Lutheran Christians
 0,41% Baptists
 0,41% Roman Catholics
 0,36% Jehovah's Witnesses
 0,24% Old Believers
 0,17% Pentecostals
 0,14% Muslims
 0,11% Adventists
 0,10% Methodists
 3.25% Other religions

There are also a number of smaller Jewish, and Buddhist groups. The organisation Maavalla Koda (Taaraism) unites adherents of animist traditional religions. The Russian neopagan organisation "Vene Rahvausu Kogudus Eestis" is registered in Tartu.

The irrereligiousity of Estonians is a relic of Soviet occupation time, but culturally Estonia still belongs to the Lutheran culture sphere, like most of Northern Europe.

Vital statistics

Vital statistics for the Governorate of Estonia 
The Governorate of Estonia comprised the northern part of present-day Estonia. The southern part was part of the Governorate of Livonia.

Present Estonia 

Source: Statistics Estonia

1 Population figures from 2000 on were revised based on the 2011 Estonian census and various registers.

According to the preliminary data of Statistics Estonia, 1,357,739 persons lived in Estonia on 1 January 2023. At 1 January 2022 lived in Estonia 1,331,796 persons, increase in 2022 25,943 persons. (1,330,068 at 1 January 2021, increase in 2021 1,728 persons).

Current vital statistics

See also 
 Estonization
 Baltic Germans
 Estonian Swedes
 Russians in Estonia
 Võros
 Aging of Europe

References

External links